The Pakistan Cycling Federation is the national governing body of cycle racing in Pakistan. It was established in 1947 and is based in Peshawar.

Syed Azhar Ali Shah is the current President of the PCF.

PCF's main road bicycle racing event is the Tour de Pakistan.

History 
The Pakistan Cycling Federation was formed in 1947 after the independence of Pakistan. It organized the inaugural National Cycling Championship in 1948 at the time of National Games in Karachi, which were declared open by Muhammad Ali Jinnah, founder of Pakistan. Jinnah was also the first President of Pakistan Cycling Federation.

Affiliations 
The Pakistan Cycling Federation is affiliated with:

 Union Cycliste Internationale
 Asian Cycling Confederation
 Pakistan Sports Board

Affiliated associations 
The following bodies are affiliated with the PCF:

 Balochistan Cycling Association
 Islamabad cycling Association
 Khyber Pakhtunkhwa Cycling Association
 Punjab Cycling Association
 Sindh Cycling Association
 Pakistan Army
 Water and Power Development Authority
 Sui Southern Gas Company
 Bikestan cycling Academy (private club)

Major events

Tour de Pakistan 
The Tour de Pakistan International Cycling Race starts from Karachi and ends in Peshawar, with about 150 domestic and international cyclists taking part every year. This race is among the longest in the world, covering a distance of 1,648 km in eleven stages with four days of rest en route. Teams from Water and Power Development Authority, Pakistan Army, Sui Southern Gas Company, along with teams of the four provinces and Islamabad regularly take part in domestic and international cycling tournaments.

Tour De Galyat 
Tour De Galyat National road cycle race is organized jointly by Pakistan Cycling Federation, Khyber Pakhtunkhwa Cycling Association and sponsored by Tourism Corporation Khyber Pakhtunkhwa. Tour De Galyat was two stages: stage one is from Islamabad to Abbottabad, while the second stage starts from Abbottabad and ends at Nathia Gali.

See also 
 Sport in Pakistan

References

External links
 Official Site

National members of the Asian Cycling Confederation
Cycling
Cycle racing in Pakistan
Sports organizations established in 1947
1947 establishments in Pakistan